The House of Mensdorff-Pouilly is the name of a noble family originally from Lorraine. The family derived its name from the barony of Pouilly at Stenay in Meuse. Through Princess Sophie of Saxe-Coburg-Saalfeld, wife of Emmanuel von Mensdorff-Pouilly, the family is closely related to the royal families of Belgium, Sweden, Portugal, Bulgaria and the United Kingdom.

History
In 1790, during the French Revolution, Albert Louis de Pouilly (1731–1795) emigrated with his family. His sons Albert and Emmanuel changed the family name to Mensdorff-Pouilly, named for a place in the county of Roussy in Luxembourg.

In 1818, Emmanuel von Mensdorff-Pouilly received a comital title from the Austrian Emperor, and he was recognized as noble in Bohemia (the Inkolat) in 1839. The family motto is Fortitudine et caritate. The Mensdorff-Pouilly family succeeded the extinct House of Dietrichstein, one of Europe’s most distinguished noble families.

Through Princess Sophie of Saxe-Coburg-Saalfeld, wife of Count Emmanuel von Mensdorff-Pouilly (1777–1852), the family is closely related to the royal families of Belgium, Sweden, Portugal and the United Kingdom.

Notable members 
 Count Emmanuel von Mensdorff-Pouilly (1777–1852), Vice Governor of the Fortress of Mainz.
 Princess Sophie of Saxe-Coburg-Saalfeld (1778–1835), married to Emmanuel; the sister of both Princess Victoria of Saxe-Coburg-Saalfeld and King Leopold I of Belgium; aunt of Queen Victoria of the United Kingdom.
 Alexander von Mensdorff-Pouilly, Prince von Dietrichstein zu Nikolsburg (1813–1871), son of Emmanuel and Sophie; Austrian Foreign Minister (1864–1866).
 Count Albert von Mensdorff-Pouilly-Dietrichstein (1861–1945), younger son of Alexander; Austrian diplomat.
 Countess Clotilde Apponyi de Nagy-Apponyi (1867–1942), daughter of Alexander; women's rights advocate and diplomat for Hungary.

Gallery

Literature 
 Eddie de Tassigny: Les Mensdorff-Pouilly. Le destin d'une famille émigrée en 1790. Le Bois d’Hélène, Bihorel 1998.

References